Subaşı is a belde (town) in Meriç district of Edirne Province, Turkey. The population of Subaşı was 2018  as of 2013. The settlement was founded in the 19th century by Pomak refugees following the Russo-Turkish War (1877-1878) . Later some Yörüks ( Turkmens) also settled in Subaşı. In 1992, Subaşı was declared a seat of township. Main economic activity of Subaşı is agriculture. Rice, wheat, corn, bean and  sunflower are the main crops.

References

Populated places in Edirne Province
Towns in Turkey
Populated places in Meriç District